The year 643 BC was a year of the pre-Julian Roman calendar. In the Roman Empire, it was known as year 111 Ab urbe condita . The denomination 643 BC for this year has been used since the early medieval period, when the Anno Domini calendar era became the prevalent method in Europe for naming years.

Events

Births

Ezekiel, prophet

Deaths
 Manasseh, king of Judah
 Duke Huan of Qi, ruler of the state of Qi

References